The following lists events that happened during 2015 in Venezuela.

Incumbents
President: Nicolás Maduro
Vice President: Jorge Arreaza

Governors
Amazonas: Liborio Guarulla 
Anzoátegui: Aristóbulo Istúriz
Apure: Ramón Carrizales
Aragua: Tareck El Aissami 
Barinas: Adán Chávez 
Bolívar: Francisco Rangel Gómez
Carabobo: Francisco Ameliach  
Cojedes: Erika Farías 
Delta Amacuro: Lizeta Hernández
Falcón: Stella Lugo 
Guárico: Ramón Rodríguez Chacín
Lara: Henri Falcón 
Mérida: Alexis Ramirez 
Miranda: Henrique Capriles Radonski 
Monagas: Yelitza Santaella
Nueva Esparta: Carlos Mata Figueroa 
Portuguesa: Wilmar Castro 
Sucre: Luis Acuña 
Táchira: José Vielma Mora 
Trujillo: Henry Rangel Silva
Vargas: Jorge García Carneiro
Yaracuy: Julio León Heredia
Zulia: Francisco Arias Cárdenas

Events

February
19 February — Venezuelan police arrest the Opposition Mayor of Caracas Antonio Ledezma without a warrant on the anniversary of the arrest of another opposition leader Leopoldo Lopez. The President of Venezuela Nicolas Maduro accused him of organizing a coup d'état with the support of the United States but the US has denied this.
24 February — in San Cristóbal, Táchira, Kluivert Roa is killed by an officer of the Policía Nacional Bolivariana in a protest against President Nicolás Maduro.

March
 9 March — U.S. President Barack Obama signs an executive order declaring Venezuela a national security threat to the U.S.
 15 March — The National Assembly passed the Anti-Imperialist Enabling Law to President Nicolás Maduro, that allows him to legislate from 15 March to 31 December.

Media 

 El desertor, directed by Raúl Chamorro.

References

 
Years of the 21st century in Venezuela
Venezuela
Venezuela
2010s in Venezuela